Dolbina borneensis is a species of moth of the  family Sphingidae. It is known from Malaysia, Thailand and Borneo.

References

Dolbina
Moths described in 2009